The Kotwica (Polish for "Anchor") was a World War II emblem of the Polish Underground State and Armia Krajowa (Home Army, or AK). It was created in 1942 by members of the AK Wawer Minor sabotage unit, as an easily usable emblem for the Polish struggle to regain independence. The initial meaning of the initials PW was Pomścimy Wawer ("We shall avenge Wawer"). This was a reference to the Wawer massacre (26–27 December 1939), which was considered to be one of the first large scale massacres of Polish civilians by German troops in occupied Poland.

At first, Polish scouts from sabotage groups painted the whole phrase upon walls. However, it was soon abbreviated to the letters PW, which over time came to symbolise the phrase Polska Walcząca ("Poland Fighting"). Early in 1942, the AK organised a contest to design an emblem to represent the resistance movement, and the winning design (pictured) by Anna Smoleńska, a member of the Gray Ranks who herself participated in minor sabotage operations, combined the letters P and W into the Kotwica.

Smoleńska was arrested by the Gestapo in November 1942 and died in Auschwitz in March 1943, at the age of twenty-three.

History of the emblem
The Kotwica was first painted on walls in Warsaw, as a psychological-warfare tactic against the occupying Germans, by Polish boy scouts on 20 March 1942.

On 27 June 1942 it was used to initiate a new form of minor sabotage. In order to commemorate the patron saint's day of the Polish President Władysław Raczkiewicz and the Commander-in-Chief Władysław Sikorski, members of the Armia Krajowa in Warsaw stamped several hundred copies of the German-backed propaganda newspaper, Nowy Kurier Warszawski (The New Warsaw Courier), with the Kotwica. This became an annual event during the German occupation. In its first year only 500 copies were stamped with the emblem but this number grew to 7,000 the following year.

On 18 February 1943, the Armia Krajowa's commander, General Stefan Rowecki, issued an order specifying that all sabotage, partisan and terrorist actions be signed with the Kotwica. On 25 February, the official organ of the Armia Krajowa, Biuletyn Informacyjny, called the Kotwica "the sign of the underground Polish Army". The emblem gained enormous popularity and became recognised throughout occupied Poland. During the later stages of the war, most of the political and military organisations in Poland (even those not related to the Armia Krajowa) adopted it as their symbol. It was painted on the walls of Polish cities, stamped on German banknotes and post stamps, printed on the headers of underground newspapers and books, and it also became one of the symbols of the Warsaw Uprising (the letters P and W are also abbreviations of Wojsko Polskie ("Polish Army") and Powstanie Warszawskie ("Warsaw Uprising").

After World War II, Poland's communist regime banned the Kotwica, although it continued to be used abroad by associations of former Armia Krajowa members living in exile.

Prohibition of the emblem's use was relaxed in Poland in the later years of communist rule and in 1976 it became one of the symbols of Ruch Obrony Praw Człowieka i Obywatela (ROPCiO), an anti-communist organisation defending human rights in Poland. It was also adopted by other anti-communist political organisations, ranging from the rightist Confederation of Independent Poland (KPN) of Leszek Moczulski to Solidarność Walcząca (Fighting Solidarity), an organisation formed in response to the de-legalisation of the independent trade union Solidarity and government repression of the opposition after martial law was declared in Poland in 1981.

Gallery

See also

 Home Army
 Polish resistance movement in World War II
 Minor sabotage during World War II in Nazi-occupied Poland
 Warsaw Uprising
 Symbols of Poland

References

 History of the Kotwica (in Polish) Internet Archive. Retrieved July 7, 2013.
 Article about the "Small sabotage" unit (in Polish)

Further reading

 Lesław J. Welker "Symbolika znaków Polski Walczącej", publisher Adam Marszałek , 
 Jan Bijata, Wawer, Książka i Wiedza, Warszawa 1973

Home Army
Poland in World War II
National symbols of Poland